Maria K. Lehtinen is a neuroscientist and Associate Professor at Harvard Medical School. She is a New York Stem Cell Foundation Robertson Neuroscience Investigator  and holds the Hannah C. Kinney, MD Chair in Pediatric Pathology Research at Boston Children's Hospital. Her research focuses on cerebrospinal fluid-based signaling in the central nervous system.

Education and Training 
Lehtinen did her undergraduate studies at University of Pennsylvania. She then received her PhD in Neurobiology from Harvard University working in the laboratory of Azad Bonni. Her graduate work elucidating the biological mechanisms of oxidative stress has been cited over 700 times.

Lehtinen did a postdoctoral fellowship in the laboratory of Anna-Elina Lehesjoki at the University of Helsinki in Finland where she discovered a physiological mechanism underlying progressive myoclonus epilepsy. She then continued her postdoctoral work with Christopher A. Walsh at Boston Children's Hospital, discovering that cerebrospinal fluid (CSF) affects the proliferation of neural progenitor cells during brain development.

Career and Research 
In 2010, Lehtinen received a prestigious K99/R00 NIH Pathway to Independence award from the National Institute of Neurological Disorders and Stroke. This award funded her transition from postdoctoral fellow to assistant professor as she launched her independent laboratory at Boston Children's Hospital studying CSF-mediated signaling during development.

Lehtinen's work has shed light on several crucial aspects of biology. Her early groundbreaking work demonstrated formerly unrecognized spatial heterogeneity in the choroid plexus. She has made several discoveries on the mechanisms of brain development, and how that development is regulated by amniotic fluid and CSF. Her work has also identified mechanistic underpinnings of developmental abnormalities including choroid plexus and ciliary body tumorigenesis  and microcephaly in LIG4 syndrome

Publications

Awards and honors 
Lehtinen was a recipient of the 2017 Presidential Early Career Award for Scientists and Engineers.

References

Living people
Year of birth missing (living people)
Place of birth missing (living people)
American neuroscientists
American women neuroscientists
Harvard Medical School faculty
University of Pennsylvania alumni
Harvard University alumni
American women academics
21st-century American women
Recipients of the Presidential Early Career Award for Scientists and Engineers